Kaneganti Hanumanthu was a freedom fighter who rebelled against British Rule and spearheaded the Palnadu Rebellion against tax. He was executed by the British General Rutherford. He was born in Kolagutla in the Durgi mandal which is in Palnadu in Guntur district. As a local peasant leader, he refused to pay taxes to the British and participated in a revolt over the issue. He was killed while resisting British police forces at the age of 30. The following rebellion cry is attributed to Hanumanthu:

Neeru pettava, Natu vesava Kota kosava, Kuppa nurchava Endhuku kattali ra sisthu?

Translation: Have you ever irrigated any land, or plant a seed in your life? Ever harvested or trashed any field? Why would I pay you any tax for what is mine?

References
Social Changes among Balijas - Sepuri Bhaskar

http://aiksc2010atguntur.tripod.com/id19.html

Indian independence activists from Andhra Pradesh
People from Guntur district